Tralfamadore is the name of several fictional planets in the novels of Kurt Vonnegut.  Details of the corresponding indigenous alien race, the Tralfamadorians, vary from novel to novel:

 In the 1959 novel The Sirens of Titan, Tralfamadore is a planet in the Small Magellanic Cloud and the home of a civilization of machines, which dispatches Salo to a distant galaxy with a message for its inhabitants. After a part in his ship breaks, however, Salo is forced to land on Titan, a moon of Saturn, where he befriends Winston Niles Rumfoord. Rumfoord exists in much the same way as the Tralfamadorians of Slaughterhouse-Five, while Salo appears to move in a linear fashion. The translation of Tralfamadore is given by Salo as both all of us and the number 541. The Tralfamadorians were originally developed by super-beings who built them to allow themselves to search for a meaning to their lives. Unable to achieve this task, they eventually asked the machines to do it for them, and upon knowing that they could not be said to have any purpose at all, the precursor race decided to eradicate itself, just to realize that they were not even very good at this, so they used the Tralfamadorians instead to complete the annihilation of their race.
 In Vonnegut's 1965 novel, God Bless You, Mr. Rosewater, Tralfamadore is a hypothetical foreign planet, used in a purely rhetorical sense as part of a thought exercise.
 In the 1969 novel, Slaughterhouse-Five, Tralfamadore is the home to beings who exist in all times simultaneously, and are thus privy to knowledge of future events, including the destruction of the universe at the hands of a Tralfamadorian test pilot. They kidnap Billy Pilgrim, the protagonist of the novel, and place him in a zoo on Tralfamadore with Montana Wildhack, a Hollywood starlet.
 In the 1990 book, Hocus Pocus, Tralfamadore is the planet nearest to a meeting place of ancient multi-dimensional beings who supposedly control all aspects of human life, including social affairs and politics. Unlike humans, the Tralfamadorians have too much of a sense of humor to be affected by the beings. The exploits of the multi-dimensional beings are chronicled in The Protocols of the Elders of Tralfamadore (a title which parodies The Protocols of the Elders of Zion), which is published serially in a pornographic magazine called Black Garterbelt. Though the author is never specified, the media in which it is published suggests that it may be Kilgore Trout.
 In the 1997 novel, Timequake, Tralfamadore is mentioned offhand as a fantastical meeting place of anthropomorphized chemical elements.

Slaughterhouse-Five 

In the 1969 novel Slaughterhouse-Five, protagonist Billy Pilgrim reports that the Tralfamadorians look like upright toilet plungers with a hand on top, into which is set a single green eye:

...they were two feet high, and green, and shaped like plumber's friends. Their suction cups were on the ground, and their shafts, which were extremely flexible, usually pointed to the sky. At the top of each shaft was a little hand with a green eye in its palm. The creatures were friendly, and they could see in four dimensions. They pitied Earthlings for being able to see only three. They had many wonderful things to teach Earthlings about time.

Tralfamadorians have the ability to experience reality in four dimensions; meaning, roughly, that they have total access to past, present, and future; they are able to perceive any point in time at will. Able to see along the timeline of the universe, they know the exact time and place of its accidental annihilation as the result of a Tralfamadorian experiment, but are powerless to prevent it. Because they believe that when a being dies, it continues to live in other times and places, their response to death is, "So it goes." They are placid in their fatalism, and patiently explain their philosophy to Pilgrim during the interval he spends caged in a Tralfamadorian zoo. Eventually Pilgrim adopts their attitude and is returned to Earth.

References

Fictional terrestrial planets
Small Magellanic Cloud in fiction
Kurt Vonnegut characters